The moko skink (Oligosoma moco) is a species of lizard in the family Scincidae (skinks) that is endemic to New Zealand. Moko is the Māori word for lizards in general.

Distribution
It is endemic to New Zealand and is found throughout the northeastern part of the North Island, though it is most common on the islands off the east coast of the North Island. To help protect the species, 50 skinks were released into the Rotoroa Island sanctuary in January 2014.

Description
The colour and patterns are variable, but the overall colour is coppery or olive brown and it usually has an even edged dark brown stripe along the side, bordered cream or white on the top and bottom. Some individuals are very dark. It has distinctive long toes and tail and grows to a maximum of 18 cm. The very long tail can make up over half the total body length.

Ecology
Moko skinks are generally found in coastal environments. They are active mainly by day and are often seen basking on warm rocks. They are also found under logs and stones and in clay banks. They eat small insects, spiders and similar invertebrates. They often emerge from vegetation edges to hunt on beaches and open rocky areas.

Reproduction
Like most of the New Zealand native skinks, the moko skink gives birth to live young, rather than laying eggs. This appears to be an adaptation to living in a cool climate, where life is marginal for reptiles. Litters of up to eight are born around February.

References

External links
Oligosoma moco in the NZ Lizards Database
Oligosoma moco in the Reptile Database
Oligosoma moco at Tiritiri Matangi website
Moko Skink at Te Ara website

Oligosoma
Reptiles of New Zealand
Reptiles described in 1839
Taxa named by André Marie Constant Duméril
Taxa named by Gabriel Bibron